What If We Fall in Love is a duet album by American country music artists Crystal Gayle and Gary Morris. It is Gayle's fourteenth studio album and Morris' sixth studio album. Three of its tracks found positions on the Billboard Hot Country Singles chart. Chronologically, they were "Makin' Up for Lost Time", which reached the #1 position, "Another World", which was a #4 hit, and "All of This and More", which only rose to #26. The album itself rose to #25 on the Top Country Albums chart. It was released in November 1986.

"Another World" became the theme song of the NBC daytime soap opera of the same name; Crystal appeared in a few shows of the series around this time as herself, almost becoming a victim of the serial killer plot airing at the time.  "Makin' Up for Lost Time" had been previously featured in the night time drama Dallas.

Personnel
Adapted from liner notes.

Eddie Bayers - drums (track 6), percussion (tracks 2, 3, 5)
Barry Beckett - piano (track 6)
Dennis Burnside - Fender Rhodes (track 6), string arrangements (tracks 1, 4, 5, 10), conductor (tracks 1, 4, 5, 10)
Robert Byrne - background vocals (tracks 5, 8)
Larry Byrom - electric guitar (tracks 6, 9)
Joe Chemay - bass guitar (tracks 1, 2, 5, 8, 9)
Crystal Gayle - lead vocals (all tracks)
Steve Gibson - acoustic guitar (track 5), electric guitar (tracks 1, 2, 6)
Vicki Hampton - background vocals (tracks 2, 4, 9)
John Hobbs - keyboards (tracks 1, 2, 5, 8), piano (track 9)
Jim Horn - saxophone (tracks 2, 5)
David Innis - synthesizer (all tracks except 5 & 7)
John Barlow Jarvis - piano (track 6)
Mary Ann Kennedy - background vocals (tracks 3, 10)
Randy Kerber - piano (tracks 4, 7, 10)
Mike Lawler - synthesizer (all tracks except 6)
Paul Leim - drums (tracks 1, 2, 5, 8, 9)
Josh Leo - electric guitar (tracks 3, 4, 6, 7, 10)
Carl Marsh - synclavier (tracks 2, 9)
Prentice Marsh - synthesizer (tracks 2, 5, 9)
Mac McAnally - background vocals (tracks 5, 8)
Donna McElroy - background vocals (tracks 2, 4, 9)
Gary Morris - lead vocals (all tracks)
JoAnn Neil - background vocals (tracks 2, 4, 9)
Dean Parks - electric guitar (tracks 3, 4, 7, 10)
Alan Pasqua - synthesizer (tracks 3, 4, 7, 10)
Hershey Reeves - background vocals (tracks 5, 8)
Michael Rhodes - bass guitar (track 6)
John "JR" Robinson - drums (tracks 3, 4, 7, 10)
Pam Rose - background vocals (tracks 3, 10)
Lisa Silver - background vocals (tracks 1, 7)
Neil Stubenhaus - bass guitar (tracks 3, 4, 7, 10)
Diane Tidwell - background vocals (tracks 1, 7)
Billy Joe Walker Jr. - electric guitar (tracks 1, 2, 5, 8)
Dennis Wilson - background vocals (tracks 1, 7)

Chart performance

References

1987 albums
Crystal Gayle albums
Gary Morris albums
Warner Records albums
Albums produced by Jim Ed Norman